Emil Berg is a Swedish singer-songwriter from Linköping. He had a debut hit with "Du swipa höger" making it to number 2 on the Swedish Singles Chart. His follow-up release was the single "Jag kommer aldrig kunna dö med dig".

Discography
Adapted from Spotify.

Singles

References

External links

Facebook

Swedish male singers
Living people
People from Linköping
Year of birth missing (living people)
Swedish-language singers